Hvozdec may refer to:
 Hvozdec (Beroun District), Central Bohemian Region
 Hvozdec (Brno-Country District), South Moravian Region
 Hvozdec (České Budějovice District), South Bohemian Region